Stormin' is the debut album by the Detroit, Michigan R&B group Brainstorm. It was released in 1977 on Tabu Records and produced by Jerry Peters.

Track listing
"Lovin' Is Really My Game" (Belita Woods, Trenita Womack) - 	4:59 	
"Waiting for Someone" (Trenita Womack) - 	6:13 	
"This Must Be Heaven" (Charles Overton, Lamont Johnson, Robert Ross, William D. Myles) - 	6:35 	
"Easy Thangs" (Lamont Johnson) - 	4:48 	
"Prelude" (Jerry Peters) -  0:51 	
"Wake Up and Be Somebody" (Gerald Kent) - 	6:25 	
"Stormin'" (Lamont Johnson) -	4:20 	
"We Know a Place" (Robert Ross) - 	4:22 	
"Hangin' On" (Charles Overton, Gerald Kent) -	4:06

Charts

Singles

References

External links
 Brainstorm-Stormin at Discogs

1977 debut albums
Tabu Records albums
Albums produced by Jerry Peters
Albums recorded at Total Experience Recording Studios